German Germanovich Galynin (30 March 1922, in Tula, Russia – 18 June 1966, in Moscow) was a Russian composer, student, and continuer of the Shostakovich and Myaskovsky line in Soviet classic music.

Life and career
Raised in an orphanage ["children's home"], he taught himself to play several folk instruments and the piano. In 1941, after Operation Barbarossa began and when he was already a student at Moscow Conservatory, he joined the army as a volunteer, there directing various grass-roots performances, and writing songs and music to dramas. In 1943–50 (1945–50, according to other sources) he resumed his studies at the Moscow Conservatory under Dmitri Shostakovich and Nikolay Myaskovsky (in composition) and Igor Sposobin (in music theory). Inasmuch as in 1948 Shostakovich was accused of "formalism" in music, the same tendencies were detected in the works of his pupils, particularly Galynin. Tikhon Khrennikov criticized Galynin's First Piano Concerto in particular, although later (in 1957) he denied such an assessment. Nevertheless, the composer was awarded the Stalin Prize in 1951 for his "Epic Poem" (1950).

Despite falling seriously ill with schizophrenia in 1951 and in consequence spending a considerable part of his life in hospitals and psychiatric clinics, Galynin remained an active composer. His work is a bright phenomenon in Soviet classical music though still underestimated, unfortunately, in his homeland and largely overlooked in the West. Within the well-developed system of public Children's Music Schools in Russia and the former Soviet republics Galynin is most gratefully remembered for his short and easy pieces of music composed for beginners, some of them being variations of popular folk melodies. "The composer’s bright and original talent was a union of melodic generosity, picturesque harmonies, a sense of modern colouring, and elegance of classical form", the Encyclopedia of Music (Moscow, 1973) wrote of him.

Galynin died in Moscow in 1966.

Selected works
1939–41 Sonata Triad for piano (revised 1963)
1939 Spanish Fantasy for piano
1945 Suite for piano
1946 First Concerto for Piano and Orchestra
1947 String Quartet No 1
1949 Piano Trio
1949 Suite for String Orchestra
1950 Epic Poem (Russian: Эпическая поэма for Symphonic Orchestra (The State Stalin Prize), 1951)
1950 Death and the Maiden, (Девушка и смерть, Oratorium (inspired by Maxim Gorky’s poem)
1951 Youth Festive Ouverture (Молодёжная праздничная увертюра) for Symphonic Orchestra
1956 String Quartet No. 2
1959 Aria for Violin and String Orchestra
1959 Four Preludes for piano
1965 Second Concerto for Piano and Orchestra
 1966 Scherzo for Violin and String Orchestra

Selected recordings
 Piano Music, Volume 1; Sonata Triad, Suite, Four Preludes, Waltz, Dance, Scherzo, Spanish Fantasy, Three Pieces from The Tamer Tamed, At the Zoo. Olga Solovieva Toccata Classics
 Legends of the XX Century; Piano Concerto No. 1 (soloist Dmitri Bashkirov); Sonata Triad (Anatoli Vedernikov); Piano trio in D minor; Aria for Violin and Strings. Melodiya CD1001808 (2011)
 Complete Works for Strings; Scherzo for Violin and Strings, Aria for Violin and Strings, Suite for Strings, String Quartets No. 1 and 2; Toccatta Classics (2020)

Bibliography

 Мнацаканова Е. Герман Галынин. – Москва, 1965.
 И.П.Кулясов. Галынин, Герман Германович // Музыкальная энциклопедия. – Т.1. – Москва: Сов. Энциклопедия, 1973. – С.891.

External links
List of Galynin's works at van Rijen's site

1922 births
1966 deaths
20th-century classical musicians
20th-century composers
Moscow Conservatory alumni
People from Tula, Russia
Russian composers
Russian male composers
Soviet composers
Soviet male classical composers
Soviet male composers
Stalin Prize winners
20th-century Russian male musicians